Usenet Explorer is a news client for the Microsoft Windows operating system (also fully compatible with the Linux Wine software ). It is designed to handle binary and text Usenet posts, and is capable of handling newsgroups as large as hundred million headers. A Usenet indexing service with 3000 day retention and boolean wildmat as search pattern language is integrated into the program.

Releases following v2.0 include automatic unpacking feature - par2 repair / unrar / joining split files without user intervention; when using integrated search or nzb file as a download source the download is presented as a single combined entry (so-called custom collection) and all the way to the ready to view or listen media files then becomes  seamless and completely automatic. This simple routine makes the program valuable to novice Usenet users.

Usenet Explorer supports all existing standards for compressing headers and includes native x64 version. The program now supports single NZB files in excess of 10gb, and Deobfuscation

The program is shareware operating on an annual subscription to retain search function; posting and par2 repair (QuickPar replacement) features are free.

See also
 List of Usenet newsreaders
 Comparison of Usenet newsreaders

External links
 UsenetExplorer.com

Usenet clients
Shareware